The Hundred Oaks Castle is a historic mansion in Winchester, Tennessee, U.S.

History
The house was built for Peter S Decherd, a lawyer from Virginia who eventually founded Decherd, Tennessee. Its construction began in 1830 on a two story plantation.   In the 1860s, it was acquired by Albert S. Marks, who served as the Governor of Tennessee from 1879 to 1881. It was named Hundred Oaks by his son Arthur and his daughter-in-law, Mary Hunt, after Arthur counted 100 oak trees on the property.  Arthur became a US diplomat in his early 20's which allowed him to travel to Europe.  His love for castles eminiated at that point.  When he returned in 1889 to his home in Winchester, he immediately wanted to transform his family's home into a castle.  Now calling it Hundred Oaks Castle.  Arthur's life was short lived and he passed due to Typhoid Fever in 1892

The house was a monastery for Paulist Fathers for five decades, until 1954. Between 1954 and the early 1990's the castle changed hands quite a few times.  Even becoming a museum and restaurant in the late 1970's  It later became the Franklin County Adult Activity Center. It was damaged due to a fire in 1990. In 1996, it was purchased by the Bramlett Family Foundation, who restored it as a dedication to their late son Kent Bramlett.  

Throughout the years, the Bramlett Family allowed tours however during and after the covid pandemic tours have not been available.

References

External links
Official website

Buildings and structures in Franklin County, Tennessee
Houses completed in 1889
Winchester, Tennessee